Muticaria is a genus of small, air-breathing land snails, terrestrial pulmonate gastropod mollusks in the family Clausiliidae, the door snails, all of which have a clausilium.

Distribution 
Distribution of the genus Muticaria includes Southeastern Sicilia in Italy and Malta.

Species
Species within the genus Clausilia include:
 Muticaria macrostoma (Cantraine, 1835) - synonyms: Clausilia scalaris Pfeiffer, 1850, type species
 Muticaria neuteboomi Beckmann, 1990
 Muticaria syracusana (Philippi, 1836)

References

Clausiliidae
Taxa named by Wassili Adolfovitch Lindholm
Gastropod genera
Taxonomy articles created by Polbot